Ukraine competed at the 2022 Winter Paralympics in Beijing, China which took place between 4–13 March 2022. In total, 20 athletes competed in two sports. Ukraine finished in second place in the medal table which was their best result at the Winter Paralympics since competing under the Ukrainian flag at the 1998 Winter Paralympics in Nagano, Japan.

On 24 February 2022, on the first day of the Russian invasion of Ukraine, the International Paralympic Committee (IPC) President Andrew Parsons described transporting the Ukrainian team to Beijing as being an enormous challenge. On 2 March 2022, Parsons confirmed that travel plans were made and that the team would compete at the Games.

Ukrainian athletes won a total of seven medals (including three gold) on the first day of competition, momentarily grabbing the first place in the medal standings.

Medalists

The following Ukrainian competitors won medals at the games. In the discipline sections below, the medalists' names are bolded.

| width="56%" align="left" valign="top" |

| width="22%" align="left" valign="top" |

Competitors
The following is the list of number of competitors participating at the Games per sport/discipline.

Biathlon

Ukraine competed in biathlon.

Anastasiia Laletina did not compete in the middle-distance race after her father was captured by Russian forces during the Russian invasion of Ukraine.

Cross-country skiing

Ukraine competed in cross-country skiing.

See also
Ukraine at the Paralympics
Ukraine at the 2022 Winter Olympics

References

Nations at the 2022 Winter Paralympics
2022
Winter Paralympics